NGC 4333 is a barred spiral galaxy with a ring structure located about 330 million light-years away in the constellation Virgo. It was discovered by astronomer William Herschel on April 13, 1784, who described it as "F, pS, R, bM, 2nd of 3". NGC 4333 is also classified as a LINER galaxy. Despite being listed in the Virgo Cluster catalog as VCC 637, it is not a member of the Virgo Cluster but instead a background galaxy.

Nearby galaxies
NGC 4333 forms a pair with the galaxy NGC 4326, known as [T2015] nest 102514, in which NGC 4326 is the birghtest member of the pair. Both galaxies are part of the CfA2 Great Wall.

See also
 List of NGC objects (4001–5000)

External links

References

4333
040217
Virgo (constellation)
Astronomical objects discovered in 1784
Barred spiral galaxies
LINER galaxies
Ring galaxies
Great Wall filament